The Slave Lake Wolves were a Junior "B" ice hockey team based in Slave Lake, Alberta, Canada. They were members of the North West Junior Hockey League (NWJHL) and played their home games at Arctic Ice Centre.

The team temporarily ceased operations in 2011 as Slave Lake recovered from the 2011 wildfire, and therefore did not play in the 2011–12 season.

The team took a leave of absence due to lack of players prior to the 2014–15 season and have not returned.

Season-by-season record 
Note: GP = Games played, W = Wins, L = Losses, OTL = Overtime Losses, Pts = Points, GF = Goals for, GA = Goals against, PIM = Penalties in minutes

References

External links 
Official website of the Slave Lake Wolves

Ice hockey teams in Alberta
2014 disestablishments in Alberta
Ice hockey clubs disestablished in 2014